Pierre-Richard Bruny (born 6 April 1972) is a Haitian former professional footballer who played as a defender for Don Bosco FC and Joe Public.

Club career
Mostly playing as a sweeper, Bruny played most of his career for Don Bosco FC, except for two seasons at Trinidadian side Joe Public F.C.

International career
A former national team captain and long-serving veteran, Bruny made his debut for Haiti in a July 1998 Caribbean Cup match against the Netherlands Antilles. He was a Haiti squad member at the 2002 and 2007 Gold Cup Finals and he played in 16 World Cup qualification matches between 2000 and 2008.

Honours
Haiti
 Caribbean Cup: 2007

Individual
 Caribbean Cup Most Valuable Player: 2007

References

External links
 

1972 births
Living people
Haitian footballers
Association football defenders
Haiti international footballers
2002 CONCACAF Gold Cup players
2007 CONCACAF Gold Cup players
2009 CONCACAF Gold Cup players
Ligue Haïtienne players
Don Bosco FC players
Joe Public F.C. players
Haitian expatriate footballers
Haitian expatriate sportspeople in Trinidad and Tobago
Expatriate footballers in Trinidad and Tobago